The 1984 AMCU-8 men's basketball tournament was held March 8–10, 1984 at the Hammons Student Center at Southwest Missouri State University in Springfield, Missouri. This was the first edition of the tournament for the Association of Mid-Continent Universities, now known as the Summit League.

 defeated  in the title game, 73–64, to win their first AMCU/Summit League championship. However, the Leathernecks did not earn a bid to the 1984 NCAA Division I men's basketball tournament.

Format
All eight conference members qualified for the tournament. First round seedings were based on regular season record.

Bracket

References

1983–84 AMCU-8 men's basketball season
Summit League men's basketball tournament
College basketball tournaments in Missouri
Sports in Springfield, Missouri
Association of Mid-Continent Universities men's basketball tournament